Diptychia is a monotypic moth genus in the family Geometridae. Its only species, Diptychia rhodotenia, is known from Madagascar. Both the genus and species were first described by Paul Mabille in 1898.

References

 Mabille (1897). "Description de Lépidoptères nouveaux". Annales de la Société Entomologique de France. 66 (2–3): 182–231, pl. 9.

Ennominae
Moths of Madagascar
Moths of Africa